The name Astor House Hotel may refer to:

in China
 Astor House Hotel (Shanghai), a former hotel in Shanghai, China
 The Pujiang Hotel in Shanghai that succeeded the former Astor House Hotel
 Richards' Hotel and Restaurant, a former hotel in Shanghai that preceded the Astor House Hotel

in the United States
 Astor House in New York City, New York, in the United States
 Astor House (Golden, Colorado), also known as Astor House Hotel, listed on the National Register of Historic Places